Stuart Littler (born 19 February 1979) is the head coach of Oldham in RFL League 1. He is a former Ireland international rugby league footballer and a former head coach of Ireland.

Littler played for the Salford City Reds in the Super League, playing for his hometown club, Leigh Centurions and finishing his career with Swinton Lions, retiring at the end of the 2016 season.

Background
Littler was born in Higher End, Wigan, Greater Manchester, England. He is of Irish descent.

He is a lifelong resident of Leigh.

Career
Littler is an Ireland international.

Littler was expected to leave the club following Salford's relegation to National League One. Littler was expected to seal a move to Harlequins RL, however Chairman Ian Lenagan decided not to offer him a deal.

Littler joined Salford in 1998 – his first professional club and is equal top-try scorer in a season for the club, alongside David Watkins.

He was named in the Ireland training squad for the 2008 Rugby League World Cup, and the Ireland squad for the 2008 Rugby League World Cup.

In October and November 2014, Stuart played in the 2014 European Cup competition.

In 2016, he was called up to the Ireland squad for the 2017 Rugby League World Cup European Pool B qualifiers.

Coaching

Swinton Lions
After retiring with Swinton he remained with the club as an assistant coach under head coach John Duffy. When Duffy left the club in July 2017, he stepped into the head coach's shoes commencing with an away match at Bradford Bulls' Odsal Stadium on 23 July 2017.
He parted company with Swinton in July 2021.

Oldham RLFC

On 6 October 2021, he was reported as the new head coach for Oldham RLFC.

References

External links
Salford City Reds profile
(archived by web.archive.org) Salford profile
(archived by web.archive.org) Ireland profile
 SL Stats
(archived by web.archive.org) Salford Career Stats

1979 births
Living people
English people of Irish descent
English rugby league coaches
English rugby league players
Ireland national rugby league team captains
Ireland national rugby league team coaches
Ireland national rugby league team players
Leigh Leopards players
Oldham R.L.F.C. coaches
People from Higher End
Rochdale Hornets players
Rugby league players from Wigan
Rugby league second-rows
Salford Red Devils players
Swinton Lions coaches
Swinton Lions players